Ó Buadhaigh is a Gaelic Irish surname.

Background

Now rendered Bowe(s) and found mainly in counties Carlow, Laois, Kilkenny, Tipperary and Waterford, the original surname represented a sept of the Éile; specifically, a sept of the Éile Uí Chearbhaill. They left, or were expelled, from Éile Uí Chearbhaill sometime around or before 1200. By the 1290s, they were found as O'Bothy, O'Bouy, and other forms located in Osraighe, Tipperary, and Loígis.

A number of other families of the name, or one like it, are found elsewhere in Ireland. All are probably native, and distinct from bearers of the surname in Britain.

Notables

 John George Bowes (c. 1812-1864) County Monaghan-born businessman
 Tommy Bowe (born 1984), Irish rugby union footballer
 John Bowe (Irish financier)

References

 Ó Buadhaigh Éile: Origins of the Leinster surname Bowe/Bowes, Journal of the Genealogical Society of Ireland, volume 15, 2014.

External links
 Ó Buadhaigh  Bowe(s) Bouge

Surnames of Irish origin
Gaelic-language surnames
Irish-language surnames